Argyrocheila bitje is a butterfly in the family Lycaenidae. It is found in Cameroon and Zambia. Its habitat consists of primary forests.

References

Butterflies described in 1915
Poritiinae
Butterflies of Africa
Taxa named by George Thomas Bethune-Baker